Cranstackie is a mountain of  in Sutherland, the northwestern tip of the Scottish Highlands. It is a Corbett located west of Loch Eriboll and northeast of Foinaven. Like Foinaven and Beinn Spionnaidh to the northeast, its top is covered with loose, broken quartzite. The slope is much steeper on the west side than the east, but neither approach is easy due to the covering of loose rock.

References

Corbetts
Mountains and hills of the Northwest Highlands
Marilyns of Scotland